Ron Hillis (19 February 1906 – 6 December 1976) was an Australian rules footballer who played with South Melbourne in the VFL during the 1930s. 

A full back, Hillis was a Best and Fairest award winner with South Melbourne in 1930 and 1935. He was also a 4 time VFL representative at interstate football. Despite playing 19 games during the 1933 season, injury prevented him from being a member of their premiership side that year.

External links

1906 births
Australian rules footballers from Victoria (Australia)
Sydney Swans players
Bob Skilton Medal winners
1976 deaths